Big Hair Alaska is an American reality television special that aired on the TLC cable network, on September 20, 2011. The subject of the special was the Beehive Beauty Shop in Wasilla, Alaska.

Episodes

References

External links
 
 

2010s American reality television series
2011 American television series debuts
2011 American television series endings
English-language television shows
Matanuska-Susitna Borough, Alaska
TLC (TV network) original programming
Television shows set in Alaska